The Hôtel de Bernuy in rue Léon Gambetta, Toulouse, France, is a Renaissance hôtel particulier (palace) of the 16th century built by the mason Louis Privat for the wealthy woad merchant, Jean de Bernuy. This townhouse is considered a magnificent example of the introduction of the Renaissance in Toulouse and a symbol of the city's affluence.

History

The facade of Hôtel de Bernuy was built between 1503 to 1504, so was the gothic brick courtyard and its tower. The Renaissance stone courtyard was constructed from 1530 to 1536. The owner was a rich woad merchant, Jean de Bernuy, a Spanish Jew who had fled the inquisition and was credit-worthy enough to be the main guarantor of the ransomed King Francis I of France after his capture at the Battle of Pavia by Charles V of Spain.

It is an original example of Renaissance palaces architecture of Toulouse, with a stone decoration of the cour d'honneur (courtyard) influenced by Spanish Plateresque. The use of brick in the gothic courtyard is typical of Toulouse, while the use of stone in the Renaissance courtyard is rare and indicates the wealth of the owner.

The gothic courtyard and its staircase tower
The attention of Bernuy first focused on the back of his plot where his shops stood, and on a small gothic courtyard where he had built in 1504 a great staircase tower. Bernuy wanted his tower to be as high as his father-in-law's, the prosecutor Arnaud du Faur. Raising a tower towards the heavens was prestigious; decorating it with stone and bestowing upon it the marks of a mediaeval feudal lord, even more so. The windows of the tower have been 'bent', that indicates the skill of the stonemason Merigo Cayla.

The main gate
In 1504 Merigo Cayla was commissioned to build the main gate. Crowned with an ogee arch decorated with cabbage leaf and bordered with pinnacles, the gate conforms to the fashion of the period: flamboyant gothic. When Bernuy started to undertake his grand Renaissance courtyard, he instructed the architect Louis Privat to move this gate to rue Gambetta and to bring it up. Privat duly inserted into the brick wall several sculpted ornaments typical of the Renaissance: putti bearing the owner's motto and arms, and portraits medallions. The coexistance of the two styles (gothic and Renaissance) was frequent at that time. It had the advantage of combining prestigious ornaments, both traditional and innovative.

The Renaissance courtyard
Circa 1530, Bernuy asked to architect Louis Privat to separate the personal and professional parts of his hôtel. From 1530 to 1536 he built a new courtyard on rue Gambetta in which he gave free rein to the vocabulary of the Renaissance. The portrait medallions of the owners, shown holding phylacteries (scrolls), seem to welcome the visitors. Tall and powerful candelabra columns punctuating the arcades confer a great sense of monumentality to the courtyard. The upper gallery, supported by the great surbased arch, has windows that feature Corinthian columns, a first in Toulouse. Their design came from a treatise on architecture. The abundant use of stone, unheard of at the time in Toulouse, demonstrated the wealth of the owner.

Considering its ambitious design and extravagant dimensions, the great arch must be the most extraordinary feature of this courtyard. Its unique character also comes from the bespoke treatment of each of the coffers. Their partitions, along with the hanging roses between them, ignore the curve of the arch and are instead perfectly vertical, an effect that must have made the stonemason's work considerably more difficult.

See also 
 Renaissance architecture of Toulouse

Bibliography 
 Guy Ahlsell de Toulza, Louis Peyrusse, Bruno Tollon, Hôtels et Demeures de Toulouse et du Midi Toulousain, Daniel Briand éditeur, Drémil Lafage, 1997

References

Houses completed in the 16th century
Buildings and structures in Toulouse
Renaissance architecture in Toulouse
Hôtels particuliers in Toulouse